Paul Mallinson may refer to:

Paul Mallinson (author), see Resident Evil 2 and Star Wars Jedi Knight: Mysteries of the Sith
Paul Mallinson of the Mallinson Baronets